The Antioch School is the oldest democratic school in the United States. The school is located in Yellow Springs, Ohio and was founded in 1921 through Antioch College.

History 
Prior to the official founding of the Antioch School, Antioch College operated a school called "Little Antioch" for the children of faculty founded during the tenure of the first president of the college, Horace Mann. It was founded to counteract traditional American education by promoting progressive education principles.

In 1921, the school was reorganized as a laboratory school for the college and renamed the Antioch School by college president Arthur Ernest Morgan. Morgan first began his path in experimental education in 1917 when he founded the Moraine Park School in Dayton. The school was located at the mansion of Judge William E. Mills and students from elementary to high school were supervised by college faculty. Student teachers, including Coretta Scott King, were able to have autonomy over their classrooms due to the distributed hierarchy of the school.

The school was the first democratic school in the United States with children directing their own learning. Students were involved in democratic meetings where they participate in the self governing of the school. They were divided into three groups according to social maturity and charged a yearly tuition with access to scholarships. 

In 1929, the school moved to Bryan High School and only enrolled elementary students. In 1950, the Antioch School moved to a new building designed by Eero Saarinen and Max Mercer with three classrooms, meeting space, and porch. It became independent of Antioch College in 1979 when the college was having financial solvency issues and ended its role in their education program. Members of the Yellow Springs community purchased the school and it became an independent school in the 1980s.

In 1969, a teacher purchased a used unicycle and it became emblematic of the school as a way for students to challenge themselves to succeed at something new, different, and difficult. Since the first unicycle, the school acquired them in various sizes for students of all ages.

Program 
The Antioch School offers programs for nursery, kindergarten, and two mixed-age groups of students ages 6-12. The school is run democratically developed through the principles of child-centered learning where students create curriculum and make rules with oversight from teachers. Students resolve conflicts with each other through mediation and grades are not administered.

Notable alumni 

 John Lithgow
 Tucker Viemeister

References

External links 
 Antioch School

Democratic free schools
Alternative schools in the United States
Private elementary schools in Ohio